Horní Kněžeklady is a municipality and village in České Budějovice District in the South Bohemian Region of the Czech Republic. It has about 100 inhabitants.

Administrative parts
Villages of Dolní Kněžeklady and Štipoklasy are administrative parts of Horní Kněžeklady.

References

Villages in České Budějovice District